William or Bill Carr may refer to:

Politicians
William Carr (Bristol MP) (died 1575), MP for Bristol
William Carr (Newcastle-upon-Tyne MP, died 1572), MP for Newcastle-upon-Tyne
William Carr (Newcastle-upon-Tyne MP, died 1720), MP for Newcastle-upon-Tyne
William Carr (Newcastle-upon-Tyne MP, died 1742), MP for Newcastle-upon-Tyne
William Theodore Carr (1866–1931), Member of Parliament for Carlisle
Bill Carr (politician) (1918–2000), British Conservative Party politician
William F. Carr (1910–1998), American politician

Sports
William Carr (footballer) (1848–1924), England international football goalkeeper
William Carr (rower) (1876–1942), American rower
Bill Carr (equestrian) (1901–1982), British Olympic equestrian
Billy Carr (1905–1989), English football defender
Bill Carr (1909–1966), American Olympic 400m runner
Bill Carr (coach)  (1917–2006), American football coach
Bill Carr (American football) (born 1945), American football player and college athletic director
Willie Carr (born 1950), Scottish international footballer
William Carr (arena football) (born 1975), American and arena football player and assistant coach
William Carr (cricketer) (born 1976), Australian cricketer

Military
William M. Carr (1829–1884), Medal of Honor recipient in the American Civil War
William Louis Carr (1878–1921), American Medal of Honor recipient in the Boxer Rebellion
William Carr (admiral) (1883–1966), Australian naval officer
William Guy Carr (1895–1959), Canadian naval officer and author
William Keir Carr (1923–2020), Canadian Air Force officer

Others
William Holwell Carr (1750–1830), English art dealer, art collector and painter
Sir William Ogle Carr (1802–1856), Chief Justice of Ceylon
William Broughton Carr (1837–1909), English beekeeper and author
William Henry Carr (1855–1953), English trade unionist and political activist
William Carr (biographer) (1862–1925), British biographer for the Dictionary of National Biography
Sir William Emsley Carr (1867–1941), British newspaper editor
William George Carr (1901–1996), British-born American educator and author
William Carr (historian) (1921–1991), British historian
Bill Carr (actor) (born 1955), Canadian actor and comedian